The infrastructure in Pakistan has made some progress over the last five decades. However, compared to other similar countries, the rate of improvement in Pakistan has been among the slowest for the majority of public infrastructure sectors.

Pakistan’s infrastructure is underused because the economic boom it was meant to trigger has never arrived. Over the past three years, the government has successfully staved off a balance-of-payments crisis, achieving some measure of macroeconomic stability. The comparatively poor infrastructural situation of Pakistan by international standards has a severe effect on the lives of people. The electricity shortages, lack of proper water and sanitation provisions. Above all, the increase in population to an alarming level is making our problems worse. The Government of Pakistan and its people face an uphill battle against poor infrastructure. According to the World Economic Forum Survey (2006-07) of 125 countries, Pakistan ranked 67th in the basic infrastructure category. Historically, a continual imbalance between demand and supply of infrastructure facilities is seen. In The Global Competitiveness Report (GCR) 2012-2013, released by the World Economic Forum, Pakistan is graded among the bottom 20 of the 144 economies around the world. Pakistan lacks a long-term view of competitiveness in accordance with this report.

See also
 China–Pakistan Economic Corridor

References

Economy of Pakistan
Infrastructure in Pakistan
Transport infrastructure in Pakistan